The Restitution of African Cultural Heritage. Toward a New Relational Ethics (in French: Rapport sur la restitution du patrimoine culturel africain. Vers une nouvelle éthique relationnelle) is a report written by Senegalese academic and writer Felwine Sarr and French art historian Bénédicte Savoy, first published online in November 2018 in a French original version and an authorised English translation.

Commissioned by the president of France, Emmanuel Macron, the aim of the report was to assess the history and present state of publicly owned French collections of African artworks originating from illicit or otherwise disputed acquisitions, as well as claims and a plan for subsequent steps for eventual restitutions. More specifically, the report also presents recommendations for the preparation of restitutions, such as international cultural cooperation, provenance research, legal frameworks, and ends with a list of the cultural objects involved, as well as ways to present them in the near future in African museums.

The commission of this report marks the first time a French president announced the restitution of African artefacts, and it has since prompted numerous debates and plans for a "decolonization" of museums in a number of countries.

In 2020, their report and its public response earned Bénédicte Savoy and Felwine Sarr the third place in the annual ranking of the "most influential people in the international art world", established by ArtReview magazine; and Time magazine listed them among the "100 most Influential People of 2021".

Background 
The report followed a speech by Emmanuel Macron, president of France, on 28 November 2017 at Ouagadougou, Burkina Faso, in which he addressed the policy of France in sub-Saharan Africa. The French president commissioned two academics to assess the history and composition of state-owned collections in France, as well as claims and reasons and subsequent steps for eventual restitutions. His motivation for a fundamental reorientation of the cultural policy of France with regard to Africa was expressed in the following words: "I am from a generation of French people for whom the crimes of European colonization cannot be disputed and are part of our history."
 
For the first time, a French president and his government recognized a moral right of restitution of cultural heritage, items of which are, according to French law, considered to be the inalienable property of the French state. Macron's predecessors never supported the return of African artefacts and other cultural objects in France; for example, Jacques Chirac supported collections of African art and is named in the official title of the Musée du quai Branly - Jacques Chirac. Macron's declaration has therefore been regarded as historic, regardless of how much art will eventually be returned to African countries.

The report was presented to the public on 23 November 2018, and since then has triggered numerous reactions in the French and international discussion about its claims for restitution of African art from museums in Europe or America. Despite Macron's announcement of a timely restitution, the legal requirements for such restitutions pose considerable obstacles: in France, all public assets, including the contents of publicly owned collections, such as museums, libraries or other cultural institutions, are regarded as inalienable possessions.

The authors and their mission 

The Senegalese social scientist, musician and economist Felwine Sarr became known for his essay Afrotopia, where he proposes postcolonial theories for a present and future understanding of African countries. He argues that the further development of African democracies should not be brought about by reproducing Western models; instead Africa should reinvent itself through a synthesis of traditional and contemporary forms of social organization. His lectures and academic research focus on postcolonial theory, economic policies, development, economy, econometrics, epistemology and the history of religious ideas. Formerly a professor of economics at the at Gaston Berger University (Senegal), he joined Duke University in the United States in 2020.

The French art historian Bénédicte Savoy teaches art history at the Technical University of Berlin in Germany and is also a professor at the Collège de France in Paris. Savoy has published several works on topics such as world art on Western markets, on museums in international contexts or on the illicit acquisition of cultural heritage. Since publication of the report, she has also become known as a proponent for the restitution of African cultural heritage in German collections and actively participates in research and public discussions about this issue.

In his official letter of appointment, Macron instructed the two authors to engage in discussions and workshops with various stakeholders in Africa as well as in France, including research on the colonial history of African cultural heritage. Furthermore, Macron requested concrete proposals and a timetable with proposed actions for the return of cultural objects. Through his explicit statement, "Dialogue and participation must accompany all stages of this work", Macron not only indicated a specific approach, but also opened the door for public debate about his new cultural policy and the resulting report. Since then, this public debate has intensified both in Africa, Europe and the U.S.

The contents of the report 

In this report, the authors discuss the reasons and suggest measures for restitutions of African cultural objects from French publicly owned collections to their countries or communities of origin. In accordance with Macron's commission, the scope of the report specifically relates to former French sub-Saharan colonies, and whose cultural heritage has been largely taken to France during and following colonial times.

The introductory chapter, entitled "A Long Duration of Losses" describes the history of African cultural heritage in the context of European colonisation. Central themes are the forceful appropriation of cultural objects as crime against the communities of origin. Also, the importance of collecting, studying and exhibiting African heritage, first as curios and later as ethnological objects, by European museums and scientists is presented as a central aspect of a "history of violence" and domination.

Referring to similar intentions to those expressed in their own report, Sarr and Savoy recall that in 1978, Amadou-Mahtar M’Bow, who was then the director of UNESCO, pleaded in favour of a rebalancing of global cultural heritage between the northern and the southern hemispheres. They quote M'Bow's speech "A plea for the return of an irreplaceable cultural heritage to those who created it":

Furthermore, the report considers the advocacy of public opinion since the beginning of the 2010s to be one of the main motivations for a change of attitudes in Europe. Based on their assessment that approximately 90% of all cultural heritage from sub-Saharan Africa is in the possession of Western collections, the authors understand their report primarily as a call for the timely restitution of artefacts and for the establishment of a new relationship of Europe towards Africa on the basis of mutual recognition.

After this brief, but focused history of African colonial art in Western collections and earlier claims for restitution, the three following chapters entitled "To Restitute", "Restitutions and Collections" and "Accompanying the Returns" discuss the central aspects of the tasks associated with such restitutions. Here, the authors suggest both criteria for restitution as well as a concrete timetable for the French and African authorities to follow. Finally, the appendices of the report describe the methods and steps followed by the authors, supported by corresponding documents, charts and figures on the collections in France as well as information on museums in Africa. Due to its extensive holdings of approximately 70,000 objects from Africa and its detailed archives on the provenance of the objects, the Musée du quai Branly in Paris occupies a special position in the report's list. It ends with photographs and detailed information on thirty outstanding objects in this museum, which are considered as priorities for future restitution.

The report also identifies the following important measures for a comprehensive reorientation of cultural relations: only through respectful international cooperation, with access to research, archives and documentation for people in Africa or in the African diaspora can the wide gaps between Africa and the West relating to the preservation, study and wider appreciation of African culture be narrowed. These measures include joint research and training by the participating museums, the exchange of temporary exhibitions—also among African countries—as well as the material support for appropriate networks or infrastructures for the museums in Africa and the experts working for them. To ensure that knowledge of African cultural heritage reaches younger generations, the authors also recommend effective educational initiatives.

The historical and geopolitical context 
Although the Sarr/Savoy report and the accompanying debates refer to the restitution of cultural heritage from Africa, Macron's announcement on his first visit to Africa as president of France stands in the wider context of the history, present and future of French political relations with Africa. In view of the growing political emancipation of some African countries from France, as well as the influence of China in Africa, French foreign policy is interested to maintain and develop its privileged relationship with West African countries and the wider Francophone world. Finally, the discussions and ethical justification of restitutions are examples of a changing view of European colonialism in Africa. Due to each country's colonial past and the present public assessment of this past, this historical re-evaluation has taken different paths in France, Great Britain, Belgium or Germany.

Reactions and first restitutions following the report 

Since the report was published, its analysis and recommendations have provoked numerous critical, affirmative or negative comments, both in France and other European countries. Museums and government sources in Germany and the Netherlands have issued new guidelines on future restitutions, provenance research and international cooperation. Subsequent restitutions have been made to Namibia from Germany and to Indonesia from the Netherlands. In April 2021, the Ethnological Museum in Berlin and the University of Aberdeen in Scotland announced the return of Benin Bronzes by 2022.

Contrary to some public reactions by art historians and journalists, who evoked the vision of almost empty museums, the report does not recommend a sweeping return of all African cultural heritage from France. Rather, Sarr and Savoy propose that bilateral diplomatic arrangements be made with African governments for the restitution of significant pieces on the basis of proposals by African experts. As a general recommendation, however, the authors plead for a permanent restitution of illegally acquired cultural objects. They explicitly reject a temporary return of such items as mentioned by Macron and favoured by some museum curators, such as Stéphane Martin, former director of the quai Branly museum. At a conference in June 2019, attended by some 200 academics and representatives of Ministries of Culture from Europe and Africa, the French Minister of Culture pledged that "France will examine all requests presented by African nations", but asked them not to "focus on the sole issue of restitution".

On 24 December 2020, the French government enacted a new law that allows for the permanent restitution of several cultural objects from French collections to Senegal and the Republic of Benin. Already in November 2019, the French prime minister had presented an historic sabre to the Museum of Black Civilisations in Dakar, Senegal, that is said to have belonged to Omar Saïdou Tall, a prominent 19th-century West African spiritual leader who fought French colonialists in the 1850s. This symbolic item, as well as 26 African statues that had been looted by French troops during the sacking of the Royal Palaces of Abomey in 1892 and donated by the French general Alfred Dodds to a predecessor of the Musée du quai Branly in Paris, constitute the first permanent restitutions under the new law. This restitution had already been demanded by the government of Benin in 2016, but was denied by earlier French governments.

In May 2021, new signboards explaining their future restitution were added to a group of three anthropomorphic statues representing historical kings Glélé, Ghézo and Béhanzin of Dahomey. Prior to the return of 26 objects to Benin, the museum hosted a week of lectures, discussions and historical documentary films, dedicated to the history of Dahomey. Further, a loan of 20 million Euros from the French Development Agency was allocated towards a new museum and to rehabilitate the four historical royal palaces in Abomey, a UNESCO World Heritage Site since 1985.

On 19 February 2022, an exhibition presenting contemporary Benin art as well as the 26 returned artworks was opened by the president of Benin at the Palais de la Marina in Cotonou. The opening ceremony was attended by artists, traditional chiefs and politicians, and more than 1000 visitors came the next day to see the wooden sculptures, celebrating their homecoming.

Digitisation and open access
Among other recommendations, the report called for digitisation of all information of collections of African cultural objects and research and for making this information available worldwide by free access over the Internet. In a statement on this suggestion, more than 100 international experts on digitisation and research of cultural objects pointed out their specific reservations. In particular, they cautioned against a unilateral action by Western collections and demanded that African countries must participate in such decisions. Further, African institutions should obtain copyrights for such data, since digital information is considered be of equal importance as the restitution of physical cultural objects.

Webpage on holdings of French collections 
In September 2021, the webpage "Le Monde en musée", was published by the Institut National d’Histoire de l’Art (INHA). It provides access to an annotated map of objects from Africa and Oceania in more than 240 French public collections. It was designed as a publicly accessible research tool and link between museums and research institutions, regardless of their location in the world. For each of the collections, the official name with description of its holdings, as well as information on their provenance is given.

Reactions from African countries 
As commentators from African countries such as Benin, Ethiopia, Mali, Nigeria, or Namibia have, for several decades, made requests for restitution to France, Great Britain, Germany and other countries, the report by Sarr and Savoy has prompted positive comments and generated high expectations: Kwame Opoku, a Ghanaian cultural journalist and former staff member of the United Nations office in Vienna, reported in 2019 that the International Council of African Museums (AFRICOM) has "formally addressed support" for the restitutions as suggested by the Sarr/Savoy report. Some African curators also have reacted critically to one-sided Western initiatives regarding restitutions. Flower Manase, a curator at the National Museum of Tanzania, said that first of all, African experts have to be involved as equal partners, share their own narratives and involve the communities of origin.

Other African cultural commentators, like Tanzanian journalist Charles Kayuka, have pointed to the ethnocentric Western nature of museum exhibitions, which explains why they tend not to find much interest with local visitors in Africa. Another argument of his questions the importance of traditional cultural heritage for modern, globalized African societies:

In their report, Sarr and Savoy have, however, taken account of such differences by calling for international cooperation and community involvement. With regard to the consequences for national cultural policy in African states, Felwine Sarr said in an interview with a German newspaper:

See also 

 African art in Western collections
Deaccessioning
 Decolonization of museums
 International Inventories Programme (project for cultural heritage from Kenya in Western collections)

Notes

References

Works cited and further reading 
 
 
 
 

African art
African art museums
Art and cultural repatriation

Foreign relations of France
Restitution